Park Circle is a neighborhood in northwest Baltimore, Maryland.

References

Neighborhoods in Baltimore
Northwest Baltimore